James Parnell Spears (born c. 1953) is the father of American singers/actresses Britney and Jamie Lynn Spears and producer Bryan Spears.

Early life and family 
James Parnell Spears was born in Kentwood, Louisiana, to June Austin Spears (1930–2012), and Emma Jean Spears (née Forbes; 1934–1966). When Spears was 13, his mother committed suicide on the grave of her infant son following a miscarriage. Spears also survived a car accident that killed a football teammate aged 17.

Spears's first wife was Debbie Sanders Cross, who remains his friend. In July 1976, he married his second wife, Lynne Irene Bridges. She filed for divorce in 1980, requesting a temporary restraining order, fearing that he would "become angry when he is served with these papers" and harass or harm her, "especially if he has been drinking alcoholic beverages, as he has done in the past." However, they reconciled and had Britney the following year. They divorced in May 2002 and reconciled without remarrying around 2010. They were seen still united in 2014, but were evidently completely separated by 2020. They have three children: son Bryan Spears (born 1977) and daughters Britney Spears (born 1981) and Jamie Lynn Spears (born 1991). They also have five grandchildren: grandsons Sean Preston Federline (born 2005) and Jayden James Federline (born 2006) from Britney, granddaughters Maddie Briann Aldridge (born 2008) and Ivey Joan Watson (born 2018) from Jamie Lynn, and Sophia Alexandra Spears (born 2011) from Bryan.

Later life 
Spears struggled with alcohol later in life and eventually went to rehab in 2004. He later suffered a near-fatal colon rupture in 2019.

Conservatorship controversy 

Spears came to prominence as a public figure in 2019 with the rise of a movement to terminate his daughter's conservatorship, dubbed #FreeBritney. This movement has garnered support from a number of celebrities, including Cher, Paris Hilton, and Miley Cyrus, as well as the nonprofit organization American Civil Liberties Union. On April 22, 2019, fans protested outside the West Hollywood City Hall to demand Britney's release from the psychiatric facility where she had been staying since Spears's illness in January.

During a May 2019 hearing, Judge Brenda Penny ordered "an expert evaluation" of the conservatorship. In September 2019, Britney's ex-husband Kevin Federline obtained a restraining order against him following an alleged physical altercation between Spears and one of Britney's sons. Britney's longtime care manager, Jodi Montgomery, temporarily replaced Spears as her conservator of the person on September 10, 2019. In the same month, a hearing resulted in "no decisions made" about the conservatorship arrangement.

In August 2020, Spears called the #FreeBritney movement "a joke" and its organizers "conspiracy theorists". On August 17, 2020, Britney's court-appointed lawyer submitted a court filing that documented her desire to have her conservatorship altered to reflect "her current lifestyle and her stated wishes", to instate Montgomery as her permanent conservator, and to replace Spears with "a qualified corporate fiduciary" as conservator of her estate. Four days later, Judge Penny extended the established arrangement until February 2021. In November 2020, Judge Penny approved Bessemer Trust as co-conservator with Spears of his daughter's estate. A documentary focusing over his daughter's career and Spears's conservatorship over her, Framing Britney Spears, premiered on FX in February 2021.

On June 23, 2021, Britney gave testimony regarding her father, stating that he sent her to a rehab and mental facility against her will in January 2019. She also stated that she is afraid of him and that he has committed "conservatorship abuse". Britney said he should not be able to walk away and that he should go to jail for his actions.

On September 7, 2021, Spears filed a petition to end the conservatorship over his daughter. Judge Brenda Penny suspended Spears as conservator on September 29, 2021.

On November 12, 2021, the conservatorship was terminated by Judge Penny following Britney's public testimony in which she accused her management team and family of abuse.

References

External links 

1953 births
Living people
American people of English descent
People from Kentwood, Louisiana
James